General elections were held in the Seychelles between 23 and 26 June 1979 to elect a President and People's Assembly. Following a coup in 1977, the Seychelles People's Progressive Front (previously the Seychelles People's United Party) was the sole legal party at the time. The only candidate in the presidential election was SPUP leader France-Albert René.

The SPUP won all 25 seats in the National Assembly, and René's candidacy was approved by 98% of voters with a voter turnout of 96.4%.

Results

President

National Assembly

References

1979 in Seychelles
Elections in Seychelles
One-party elections
Seychelles
Presidential elections in Seychelles
Election and referendum articles with incomplete results
Single-candidate elections